Tobias Dombrowa (born 24 July 1999) is a German professional footballer who plays as a midfielder for 1. FC Lokomotive Leipzig.

Career

SV Babelsberg 03
Born in Potsdam, Dombrowa played youth football for Fortuna Babelsberg before joining SV Babelsberg 03 in 2011. In July 2017, Dombrowa signed a four-year first-team contract with Babelsberg. He made his professional debut as an 84th-minute substitute in a 2–1 Regionalliga Nordost victory over Hertha BSC II on 30 July 2017. He made 11 appearances across the 2017–18 season. He scored the first goal of his career on 8 August 2018 with the third goal of a 5–0 win over Berliner AK 07. Over four seasons at Babelsberg, Dombrowa scored 8 goals in 71 appearances.

SV Meppen
On 19 June 2021, Dombrowa signed for 3. Liga side SV Meppen on a two-year contract. He made his 3. Liga debut on 24 July 2021 in a 3–1 defeat to Hallescher FC.

References

External links

1999 births
Living people
German footballers
Sportspeople from Potsdam
Footballers from Brandenburg
Association football midfielders
SV Babelsberg 03 players
SV Meppen players
1. FC Lokomotive Leipzig players
3. Liga players
Regionalliga players